José Christiano de Freitas Henriques Junior (1832–1902), mostly known as Christiano Junior, was a Portuguese-born photographer. He was one of the most prominent photographers in Argentina in the 19th century.

During a time, Christiano Junior was associated with British colleague Alexander Witcomb, who would later acquire Junior's studio and photographs, adding them to his own material. In 1970, Witcomb's entire artwork became part of the General Archive of the Nation as an evidence of the history of Argentina registered on photographs.

Biography 
Born in Flores island, Azores Islands, Portugal, he emigrated to Brazil in 1855. It is unclear how Christiano Junior learned the techniques of photography. In 1863 he began its activities in Rio de Janeiro. During that period, the subjects of his photos are mainly slaves and people affected by Lymphatic filariasis.

In 1865 he moved to Buenos Aires with his wife and two children, opening his first studio in 1867. It was located in Florida street N° 150. Soon after, he moved to another building that provided more space. At the beginning of the 1870s, C. Junior opened another studio in Artes street, named "Fotografía de la Infancia" (Childhood Photography), hosted by his son José V. Freitas Henriques.

Christiano Junior soon gained reputation in the city, being requested by personalities such as Domingo Faustino Sarmiento, Adolfo Alsina, Lucio V. Mansilla and Luis Sáenz Peña among others. Between 1873 and 1875 he took more than 4,000 photos, with an average of 5 customers per day.

After 1875 Christiano Junior was the official photographer and member of the Sociedad Rural Argentina, even collaborating as a writer. He had a keen interest in agriculture, and as a result of his friendship with many managers of the institution, he was called for the project.

During 1876 and 1877 the first volumes of a photo album were released. They were part of a project named Album de vistas y costumbres de la República Argentina desde el Atlántico a Los Andes, passing through some cities of Argentina and taking photos of each one of them. To make the trip to complete his project, Christiano Junior sold his studio to the Witcomb & Mackern society (predecessor or famous Casa Witcomb) in 1878.

After leaving Buenos Aires, he went on an "artistic tour" (in his own words) visiting the Santa Fe, Córdoba, Mendoza, San Luis, San Juan, Santiago del Estero, Catamarca, Tucumán, Salta and Jujuy provinces. The trip took 4 years.

Nevertheless, the project was not concluded, so in 1883, the artist ceased his activity as a photographer. Even unfinished, the work made by Christiano Junior during those 4 years is considered one of the most important and ambitious projects in Argentine and Latin America.

Christiano Junior died in Asunción, Paraguay, in 1902.

Gallery

See also 
 General Archive of the Nation
 Alexander Witcomb

Bibliography 
 "El portugués que retrató la Ciudad", Clarín, 11 July 2011
 "Christiano Junior, cuando empezaba el país", La Nación, 21 April 2002
 Enciclopedia Itaú Cultural – Visual Arts
 "Recordando a Christiano" by Abel Alexander & Luis Priamo, Oocities.org

External links 

 Colección Witcomb of Archivo General de la Nación Argentina (with several photos by Christiano Junior)
 The oldest photos of Mendoza Province

Portuguese photographers
1832 births
1902 deaths
People from Flores Island (Azores)